Rush Creek is a ghost town in Wise County, Texas, United States.

History
Rush Creek was established in the 1850s. A post office was established in 1858 and was discontinued in 1871. In the 1970s Rush Creek was abandoned. It was named for a stream that ran through the area.

References

Ghost towns in Texas